Bathytoma cataphracta is an extinct species of sea snail, a marine gastropod mollusk in the family Borsoniidae.

Distribution
This extinct marine species was found in the Miocene of Denmark, Italy, Pakistan and in the Oligocene of Hungary

Description

References

 E. Vredenburg. 1925. Description of Mollusca from the post-Eocene Tertiary formation of north-western India: Cephalopoda, Opisthobranchiata, Siphonostomata. Memoirs of the Geological Survey of India 50(1):1-350 
 W. Baluk. 2003. Middle Miocene (Badenian) gastropods from Korytnica, Poland; Part IV – Turridae. Acta Geological Polonica 53(1):29-78

cataphracta
Gastropods described in 1814